Hooligan firms (also known as football firms) are groups that participate in football hooliganism in European countries. For groups in Latin America, see barra brava and torcida organizada.

Belgium
Club Brugge – East Side
RSC Anderlecht – O Side
Royal Antwerp F.C. – X Side

Bosnia and Herzegovina
FK Sarajevo – Horde Zla
FK Željezničar Sarajevo – The Maniacs
FK Velež – Red Army Mostar
FK Borac Banja Luka – Lešinari
NK Široki Brijeg – Škripari
HŠK Zrinjski – Ultras Mostar
FK Sloboda Tuzla – Fukare Tuzla
NK Čelik Zenica – Robijaši
NK Jedinstvo Bihać – Sila Nebeska
FK Slavija Sarajevo – Sokolovi

Bulgaria
Levski Sofia – Sector B
CSKA Sofia – Sector G
Botev Plovdiv – Bultras
Lokomotiv Plovdiv – Lauta Army
Cherno More Varna – The Sailors
Spartak Varna – The Falcons
Neftochimic Burgas – The Sheiks
Minyor Pernik – The Hammers
Beroe Stara Zagora – Zara Boys

Croatia
Dinamo Zagreb – Bad Blue Boys
Hajduk Split – Torcida Split, White Boys
Osijek – Kohorta Osijek
Rijeka – Armada Rijeka

Czech Republic
Baník Most – Brüx Vandals, Radical Boys
Baník Ostrava – Silesian Hunters, Apple Commando, Thor Division, BARABI, Marienbad Ultras
Bohemians 1905 – Berserk, Tornado Boys
Dukla Prague – Young Hunters
Dynamo České Budějovice – Brigade Gauners
Jablonec – Corps Juniors
SFC Opava – Chalupáři, Young Boys, Bulldog Corps
Sigma Olomouc – NSC 88, Tarzan Boys Olomouc, Hooligans Hovada Zubr, Ultras Nové Sady, Zubr Gang Prerov
Slavia Prague – Youngsters, Brigate 97, Slavia Hooligans, Tlupa Toma Sojera, RWS
Slovan Liberec – Kategorie S, Ultras Liberec, D.B.S.
Sparta Prague – Prague Boys, Youth Firm, Falanga, Brigade Drápek z Lasičky, Ultras Sparta, Red Pirates Sparta, Frakce Rudý Úder
Teplice – Division Nord, North Warriors
Viktoria Plzeň – Service Squad, Blue-Red Wolves Plzeň, Pilsen Bo!s, Radikálové Plzeň, Pilsen Fans
Viktoria Žižkov – Ultras Viktoria
Zbrojovka Brno – Division S, Johny Kentus Gang, Orthodox Fans Brno, Torcida, Ultras

Denmark
AGF – White Pride, Aarhus Casuals
Aab – Aalborg Frontline, Aalborg Casual Youth
Esbjerg fB – Esbjerg Supras 
F.C. København – Copenhagen Casuals, Copenhagen Casuals Young Boys
Lyngby Boldklub – Blue Army

England

AFC Bournemouth – Bournemouth Casual Element
Aldershot Town – A Company
Arsenal – The Gooners, The Edecaws
Aston Villa – Villa Youth, Steamers, Villa Hardcore, C-Crew
Birmingham City – Zulu Warriors
Blackburn Rovers – Blackburn Youth, Darwen Mob, H Division, Mill Hill Mob
Blackpool – The Muckers
Bolton Wanderers – Cuckoo Boys, Boltons Service Youth
Bradford City – The Ointment
Brentford – Ealing Road Army, Brentford Youth Element
Bristol City – City Service Firm, Family Stand Ointment
Bristol Rovers – Gas Hit Squad
Burnley – Suicide Squad
Bury – Interchange Riot Squad  
Carlisle United – Border City Firm
Charlton Athletic – Cockney Firestarters, B Mob Charlton Youth Casuals
Chelsea – Headhunters
Chester – 125's
Coventry City – The Legion
Crystal Palace – Dirty 30, Holmesdale Fanatics. 
Derby County – Derby Lunatic Fringe
Everton – County Road Cutters
F.C. Halifax Town - Halifax Youth
Grimsby Town – Cleethorpes Beach Patrol, Grimsby Hit Squad
Huddersfield Town – Huddersfield Young Casuals
Hull City – Hull City Psychos
Ipswich Town – Ipswich Punishment Squad

Leeds United – Leeds United Service Crew
Leicester City – Baby Squad
Lincoln City – Lincoln Transit Elite
Liverpool – The Urchins, R.R.S. Runcorn Riot Squad
Luton Town – The MIGs, Lutonistan, Lutonlees Bury Park Boys
Manchester City – Blazing Squad, Cool Cats, Guvnors, Mayne Line Service Crew
Manchester United – The Red Army, Men In Black, Inter City Jibbers
Mansfield Town – Mansfield Shady Express  
Middlesbrough – The Frontline
Millwall – Bushwackers
Newcastle United – Newcastle Gremlins The New Batch
Nottingham Forest – Forest Executive Crew
Norwich City – Norwich Hit Squad, Under 5's
Oldham Athletic – Fine Young Casuals
Oxford United – South Midlands Hit Squad
Peterborough United – Blue Division
Plymouth Argyle – The Central Element
Portsmouth – 6.57 Crew
Preston North End – Preston Para Squad
Queens Park Rangers – Bushbabies
Reading FC – Berkshire Boot Boys
Shrewsbury Town – English Border Front
Sheffield United – Blades Business Crew
Sheffield Wednesday – Owls Crime Squad (OCS), Is That It (ITI)
Southampton – The Uglies, Inside Crew, Scum Army
Southend United – CS Crew
Stockport County — EVF (Edgeley Volunteer Force)
Stoke City —Naughty Forty
Sunderland – The Seaburn Casuals
Swindon Town – The Aggro Boys; Swindon Active Service (SAS)
Tottenham Hotspur – Yid Army, Tottenham Massive, Spurs N17
Tranmere Rovers – TSB (Tranmere Stanley Boys)
Port Vale – Vale Lunatic Fringe
West Bromwich Albion – Section Five
Watford – Watford Risk Squad 
West Ham United – Inter City Firm I.C.F
Wolverhampton Wanderers – Subway Army 1981–1984, The Bridge Boys 1987–1988, Yam Yam Army mid 2000s–present
York City – York Nomad Society (YNS)

Finland

HIFK – IFKs Yngre Grabbar
HJK – Sakilaiset
TPS
Jokerit
FC Lahti – Lahen Pojat

France

Paris Saint-Germain F.C. – Commando Pirate, Casual Firm, Indépendants
Lille OSC – LOSC Army
Olympique Lyonnais – Mezza Lyon

Germany
Borussia Dortmund – Frontline, Northside
Chemnitzer FC - HooNaRa
Dynamo Dresden – Hooligans Elbflorenz, Faust des Ostens 
Eintracht Frankfurt – Adlerfront
1. FSV Mainz 05 – Mz-Army '84

Hungary
Ferencvárosi TC – Kettes szektor (2nd Sector)

Indonesia
Arema F.C. - Curva Sud Arema
Bali United F.C. - North Side Boys 12
Persebaya Surabaya - Green Nord 27
Persib Bandung - Northern Wall, Flowers City Casuals
Persija Jakarta – Curva Sud Persija, Tiger Bois
Persikabo 1973 - Ultras Persikabo Curva Sud
Persis Solo - Surakartans 1923, Ultras 1923
PSIS Semarang - Hooligans 1932
PSS Sleman - Brigata Curva Sud

Israel

Beitar Jerusalem – La Familia

Kosovo
FC Drita – Intelektualët
KF Gjilani – Skifterat

Malaysia

 National Team - Ultras Malaya

Clubs

 Johor Darul Ta'zim – Boys of Straits
 Kedah Darul Aman F.C. – Ultras Kedah
 Kelantan F.C. – The Red Mania
 Kuala Lumpur City F.C. – Kuala Lumpur Ultras
 Melaka United – Ultras Taming Sari
 Negeri Sembilan F.C. – Ultras Nogori 9
 Penang F.C. – Ultras Panthers
 Perak F.C. – Sliver States Ultras
 Perlis F.C. – Brigate Gialloblu Perlis
 Sabah F.C. – North Borneo Ultras
 Sarawak United – Gallore Buceros
 Sri Pahang F.C. – Elephant Army
 Terengganu F.C. – Ultras Tranung

Montenegro
FK Budućnost – Varvari

Netherlands
ADO Den Haag – Midden Noord, North Side, Vak-G
AFC Ajax – A.F.C.A, F-Side, AFCA Youth, AFCA 4th, North Up Alliance, South Crew VAK410
AZ – Ben-Side,  Red White Fanatics/Alkmaar Fanatics
De Graafschap – Brigata Tifosi, Spinnenkop
PEC Zwolle – S-Side, Vandas noord, Zwolle Joet
FC Dordrecht – Island defenders, Dikeside
FC Groningen – Groningen Fanatics, Z-Side
FC Twente – Vak-P
FC Utrecht – Bunnikside, UHF
Feyenoord – U.D.F, DeF, SCF, FIIIR, Vak-S
Helmond Sport – AA-Side, NFH Hsh/Hyc
MVV Maastricht – Angel-Side, Ultras Mestreech
NAC Breda – B-Side, F7 Ultras, Vak-G
NEC – HKN, Eastside
PSV – L-Side, Lighttown Madness, Oostfront
SC Cambuur – M.I.-Side
SC Heerenveen – Nieuw Noord
Sparta Rotterdam – Spangenaren, Tifosi del Castello
Vitesse – Rijnfront, Vak126
Willem II – Kingside, Tilburg Tifosi

Norway

Aalesunds FK / SPK Rollon – Blue Army Aalesund / Blue Army Rollon
Fredrikstad FK – Brigade Rød Hvit (BRH) CCTV Firm, Red Beavers.
Ham-Kam – Briskebys Beste Borgere (BBB)
I.K. Start – Christianssands Herreekvipasje (CHE)
Lillestrøm SK – Sportsklubbens fineste (SKF)
S.K. Brann – Bergen Casuals (TGB)
Viking FK – Stavanger Yngre (SYC)
Vålerenga I.F. Fotball – Isko Boys, Enga Casuals, Enga Yngre

Poland

Arka Gdynia – Młoda Arka
Cracovia – Jude Gang
Górnik Zabrze – Torcida
Korona Kielce – YBH'01 (Young Boys Hooligans)
Lech Poznań – Brygada Banici, Young Freaks '98
Lechia Gdańsk – Młode Orły
Legia Warsaw – Teddy Boys'95, Turyści'97
Pogoń Szczecin – Terror Corps
Ruch Chorzów – Psycho Fans
Stal Stalowa Wola – Stalówka 'BZC'
Śląsk Wrocław – silesia
Widzew Łódź – Destroyers
Wisła Kraków – Sharks
Zagłębie Sosnowiec – Barra Bravas'97

Portugal
Boavista Futebol Clube – Panteras Negras – Ultras 84
Futebol Clube do Porto – Super Dragões Colectivo 95
Sport Lisboa e Benfica – Diabos Vermelhos, No Name Boys
Sporting Clube de Braga – Ultras Red Boys
Sporting Clube de Portugal – Directivo Ultras XXI, Juventude Leonina, Sporting Casuals, Torcida Verde
Vitória Sport Clube – White Angels

Russia

CSKA Moscow – Gallant Steeds, Yaroslavka 
Spartak Moscow – Gladiators Firm '96, Fratria
Zenit Saint Petersburg – Music Hall

Scotland

Aberdeen – Aberdeen Soccer Casuals, Under 5s
Airdrie – Section B, Red Army Firm  
Alloa – Alloa Defense Unit
Arbroath – Arbroath Soccer Crew, Arbroath Soccer Society
Ayr – Ayr Service Crew
Celtic – Celtic Soccer Crew, Roman Catholic Casuals, Style Mile Vandals
Dundee – Dundee Soccer Crew, Hilltown Huns
Dundee United – Tannadice Trendies, The Shimmy
Dundee & Dundee United – The Utility, Alliance Under Fives 
Dunfermline – Carnegie Soccer Service
Falkirk – Falkirk Fear, Falkirk yoof
Greenock Morton – Morton Soccer Crew, Morton Youth
Heart of Midlothian – Casual Soccer Firm, Gorgie Boot Boys, Gorgie Aggro, Shed Boys, Hearts Service Crew.
Hibernian – Capital City Service, Blackleys Baby Crew, The Family, Hibs Baby Crew, Inter City Fleet
Inverness Caledonian Thistle – North Stand Boys.
Kilmarnock – Paninaro
Meadowbank Thistle – Thistle Soccer Boys
Montrose – Portland Bill Seaside Squad, Montrose Soccer Unit
Motherwell – Saturday Service, Tufty Club, Soccer Shorties, Nu-Kru
Partick Thistle – North Glasgow Express
Queen of the South – Casuals Internal Division
Raith Rovers – Kirkcaldy Soccer Casuals, Kirkcaldy Baby Crew
Rangers – Inter City Firm, Her Majesty's Service, Rangers Soccer Babes, Section Red
St Johnstone – Fair City Firm, Mainline Baby Squad, Perth Pack, BenJDavo Renegades 
St Mirren – Love Street Division
Scotland – Scottish National Firm

Serbia
Partizan Beograd – Alcatraz, Grobari, Head Hunters, Juzni Front, Zabranjeni
Red Star Belgrade – Delije, Belgrade Boys, Red Devils, Zulu Warriors, Ultras
Rad Belgrade – United Force
FK Zemun – Taurunum Boys
Vojvodina Novi Sad – Firma
Spartak Subotica – Marinci
Radnički Niš – Meraklije
FK Novi Pazar – Ekstremi, Torcida Sandžak
OFK Belgrade – Plava Unija

Slovakia
FK Dukla Banská Bystrica – Red White Angeles
FK DAC 1904 Dunajská Streda – Felvidéki Harcosok (Hungarian: "Upland warriors")
MFK Košice – Rebels VSS, Psycho Boys 
FC Nitra – Bulldogs '95
ŠK Slovan Bratislava – Ultras Slovan Pressburg
FC Spartak Trnava – Red Black Warriors
1. FC Tatran Prešov – Village Brigade
AS Trenčín – Trenchtown Gangsters
MŠK Žilina – Yellow Green Fanatics, Terror Boys

Spain
Athletic Club – Herri Norte Taldea
Cádiz CF – Brigadas Amarillas
Celta de Vigo – Celtarras
Club Atlético de Madrid – Frente Atlético, Suburbios Firm
Club Atlético Osasuna – Indar Gorri
F.C Barcelona – Boixos Nois
Deportivo Alavés – Iraultza 1923
Deportivo de La Coruña – Riazor Blues
Málaga C.F – Frente Bokerón, Malaka Hinchas
Rayo Vallecano – Bukaneros
Real Betis – Supporters Gol Sur
Real Madrid – Ultras Sur
Real Oviedo – Symmachiarii
Real Sociedad – Peña Mujika
Real Zaragoza – Ligallo Fondo Norte, Avispero
Sevilla FC – Biris Norte
Sporting de Gijón – Ultra Boys
Valencia FC – Ultras Yomus, Curva Nord

Sweden

AIK – Firman Boys, Young Boys, 
BS BolticGöta/Degerfors IF/Färjestads BK – Värmlandsalliansen
Djurgårdens IF – Djurgårdens Fina Grabbar (DFG), Djurgårdens Yngre Grabbar, Djurgårdens Mindre Grabbar
GAIS – Gärningsmännen, GAIS Yngre, GAIS Babys
IFK Göteborg – Wisemen, Gothenburg Youth Division, Youth crew Gothenburg, Gothenburg United
Kalmar FF – Kalmarfamiljen
Hammarby IF – Kompisgänget Bajen (KGB), Sudra Divizione MMXI, Bajen Baby Squad, Bajen Yngsta, Bajen Orphans
Helsingborgs IF – Frontline
Linköpings HC – Cluben Casuals
Malmö FF – True Rockers
Örgryte IS – Red fans klan

Ukraine

Dynamo Kyiv – WBC (White Boys Club), Rodychi, Kyiv City Supporters, Albatros, Young Hope
Shakhtar Donetsk – Za Boys Ultras
FC Dnipro – Ultras'83
Karpaty Lviv – Banderstadt Ultras, Green White Ultras
Metalist Kharkiv – United Kharkiv, Pivdenna hrupa
Zorya Luhansk – Black-White Ultras
Vorskla Poltava – Crew Of Golden Eagle
Metalurh Zaporizhzhia – Beshketnyky
Volyn Lutsk – Volyn Crusaders Firm
Chornomorets Odesa – SouthFront
Nyva Ternopil – Terno Field Army
FC Oleksandriya – PFCO Supporters
Dnipro Cherkasy – Cherkasy Ultras

Wales

Cardiff City – Soul Crew
Swansea City – Jack Army, Swansea Riot Squad
Wrexham – Wrexham Frontline

See also
Football hooliganism
Hooliganism
Casual (subculture)
Association football culture
Racism in association football
Skinhead
Yobbo

References

External links
Hooli-News – latest hooligan-related news and information from around the world
Three-part BBC2 investigation on football firms from 2002
Running with the 'Naughty Forty', part of the BBC2 2002 investigation
Ultras Jagiellonia Bialystok', Website of Jagiellonia Bialystok group

Youth culture
 
Association football-related lists
Hooliganism